Hypoluxo Scrub Natural Area is a  area of protected scrub and scrubby flatwood land in Hypoluxo, Florida. It is located on Hypoluxo Road and US Route 1. The area includes hiking trails and a nature trail. The park includes a multi-level observation tower that provides an overlook of the park as well as a 14-foot Barefoot Mailman statue.. The name Hypoluxo comes from the Seminole name for what is now known as Lake Worth, roughly translated as "water all 'round—no get out". The lake was later renamed in honor of Seminole Indian War colonel William Jenkins Worth.

References

Protected areas of Palm Beach County, Florida
Nature reserves in Florida